Deniss Čerkovskis (born 2 November 1978) is a Latvian modern pentathlete who competed in: the 2000 Summer Olympics in Sydney (18th place),  the 2004 Summer Olympics in Athens (4th place), and the 2008 Summer Olympics in Beijing (11th place). He also competed at the 2012 Summer Olympics (finishing in 19th place).

In 2001 Čerkovskis was disqualified for 2 years for doping use.

References

External links
 

1978 births
Latvian male modern pentathletes
Olympic modern pentathletes of Latvia
Living people
Modern pentathletes at the 2000 Summer Olympics
Modern pentathletes at the 2004 Summer Olympics
Modern pentathletes at the 2008 Summer Olympics
Modern pentathletes at the 2012 Summer Olympics
Latvian sportspeople in doping cases
Doping cases in modern pentathlon
World Modern Pentathlon Championships medalists
Latvian Academy of Sport Education alumni